The Sikorsky S-2 was the second fixed-wing aircraft designed by Igor Sikorsky using the main wing section from the S-1 and a  Anzani 3 three-cylinder engine in a tractor configuration.

Specifications

See also

References

S-2
Biplanes
Single-engined tractor aircraft
Aircraft first flown in 1910